Lehal, now Patiala, was the famous village because of the visit by Sikhs' ninth Guru (Guru Tegh Bahadur Sahib ji) but now this village is a part of Patiala city.

History

The Gurudwara Dukh Nivaran Sahib is situated in what used to be the village of Lehal, now Patiala city. According to local tradition, supported by an old handwritten document preserved in the Gurudwara, Bhag Ram, a Jhivar of Lehal, waited upon Guru Tegh Bahadur Ji during his sojourn at Saifabad (now Bahadurgarh) and made a request that he might be pleased to visit and bless his village so that its in inhabitants could be rid of a serious and mysterious sickness which had seen their bane for a long time. The Guru visited Lehal on Magh Sudi 5, Samat 1728 Bikrami being 24 January 1672 and stayed under a banyan tree of a pond. The sickness in the village subsided. The side where Guru Tegh Bahadur had sat came to be known as Dukh Nivaran, literally meaning eradicator of suffering. The Gurudwara when completed passed under the administrative control of the Patiala state government. But it eventually transferred to the Shiromani Gurudwara Parbandhak Committee.

Geography

Patiala is one of the twenty districts of Punjab, India. Patiala District lies between 29 49’ and 30 47’ north latitude, 75 58’ and 76 54' east longitude, in the southeast part of the state.

Naming as Patiala

Baba Ala Singh (1691–1765) a Sikh chieftain from village Rampura Phul of Bathinda District, with his army of young brave men migrated to Barnala where Baba Ala Singh in 1722 set up his new state. Later Baba Ala Singh moved to a small village of Lehal where he built a new city on the village naming it as Patiala, he laid the foundations of a steady and stable state known as Phulkian Dynasty south to Sirhind. In and around Patiala he founded many villages within his territory, and reconstructed many historical Gurdwaras relating to Sikh Religion.

References

History of Punjab
Villages in Patiala district